34 male athletes (48 in 1951) represented Lebanon at the second Mediterranean games, held in Barcelona-Spain  from July 16 to 25, 1955. In these games, Lebanon got his first gold medal thanks to Moustafa Laham, although the total medal count decreased from 19 to 6.
 
Lifting 380 kg, Moustafa Laham improved on his 362.5 kg silver performance of 1951. Salim Moussa's 262.5 kg lift, although better than his 247.5 kg in 1951, only  got him a second bronze. In wrestling, Zakaria Chehab got a silver medal after a bronze in 1951, while Elie Naasan got a second bronze.

No boxing or shooting medals were won by Lebanon this time (5 in 1951), and no free wrestling competitions were held at these games (4 medals for Lebanon in 1951).

Medal table

Lebanese medals by sport

Lebanese medal winners

Medalists

External links
 Cijm.org.gr

Nations at the 1955 Mediterranean Games
Lebanon at the Mediterranean Games
1955 in Lebanese sport